Henry Hargreaves (1893 – 9 December 1917) was an English footballer who played for Stoke.

Career
Hargreaves was born in Stoke-upon-Trent and played for Newcastle Town before joining Stoke in 1912. He played 42 times for Stoke in three seasons with the club scoring five goals before being called up to the army in 1916 during the First World War. He was killed in action in France on 9 December 1917, serving as a private in the North Staffordshire Regiment.

Career statistics

References

English footballers
Stoke City F.C. players
1893 births
1917 deaths
Newcastle Town F.C. players
North Staffordshire Regiment soldiers
Association football wing halves
British Army personnel of World War I
British military personnel killed in World War I
Military personnel from Staffordshire